The Goldring Centre for High Performance Sport is a 2,000 seat indoor arena facility at the University of Toronto in Toronto, Ontario, Canada.  It is home to the University of Toronto Varsity Blues basketball and volleyball teams. The facility was completed in the fall of 2014 at a cost $58 million, with $22.5 million coming from the Ministry of Training, Colleges and Universities and $11 million from the Goldring family, for whom the centre has been named. The facility is designed by Patkau Architects and MacLennan Jaunkalns Miller Architects in joint venture, with landscape architecture by PLANT Architect, structural engineering by Blackwell, and construction services by Ellis Don.

Along with the 2,000-seat, internationally-rated field house for basketball, volleyball and other court sports, the multi-storey sport and exercise facility houses a state-of-the-art strength and conditioning centre, fitness studio, sport medicine clinic and research and teaching laboratories.

The venue is also home to the BioSteel All-Canadian Basketball Game, an annual all-star game that features the best Canadian high school basketball players of the year.

References

External links

Venue planning report

Sports venues in Toronto
Basketball venues in Ontario
University of Toronto buildings
University sports venues in Canada
Indoor arenas in Ontario